Found is the third studio album by American pop/rock band Push Play. It was released on 29 September 2009.

Track listing

References

2009 albums